The Moscow FSB headquarters shooting took place on the evening of 19 December 2019 near the headquarters of Russia’s Federal Security Service (FSB) in the center of Moscow. The first reports of the incident were controversial. During the shooting, the attacker was shot dead by a sniper. One FSB officer died on the spot, another died the next day and a few more were injured. One bystander was slightly injured. After the incident, security officials displayed aggression to the reporters covering the event. According to preliminary data, the attacker was alone, and his name was Yevgeny Manyurov, 39, who was from a small town near Moscow. Due to the inconsistency of the special services, the shooting continued after Manyurov was killed; this may have led to additional casualties. Soon after the shooting, there was report that the attacker "was shouting slogans typical of Islamic State", but in his apartment, insignia of the NOD movement, known for its provocations against the opposition, was found, along with indications that he was a member of a Neo-Nazi group called the Ethnic National Union. The Investigative Committee of Russia opened a criminal investigation into an attempt on the life of a law enforcement officer.

References

Sources
Second FSB officer dies after Moscow gunman attack
The Moscow FSB Shooting: What We Know So Far
Gunman who attacked FSB building 'was firearms enthusiast'
Нападение на Лубянку. Главное Причина атаки на ФСБ неизвестна. Ее не расследуют как теракт

FSB headquarters shooting
2019 mass shootings in Europe
2019 murders in Russia
FSB headquarters shooting
December 2019 crimes in Europe
December 2019 events in Russia
Mass shootings in Russia
FSB headquarters shooting
Federal Security Service
Terrorist incidents in Russia in 2019
Attacks on government buildings and structures
Attacks on buildings and structures in Moscow